Topics related to the erstwhile Portuguese East Indies and that was later reduced into Portuguese Goa and Damaon (officially "Estado da India" or Portuguese India), with the capital at Velha Goa, moved to Panjim in the end.

Articles of History
British occupation of Goa
Luso-Dutch War
Battle of Diu (1509)
Portuguese conquest of Goa
Goan Inquisition
Black Propaganda against Portugal and Spain
Cuncolim Revolt
Portuguese conquest of Bassein
Portuguese conquest of Ormuz
Battle of Bassein
Casa da Índia
Bombay before the British
Portuguese–Mamluk naval war and Battle of Diu
Siege of Diu (1531)
Dowry of Catherine Braganza
Portuguese Restoration War
Anglo-Portuguese Alliance
Fall of Constantinople
Portuguese discoveries
Discovery of the sea route to India
Cape route
Ottoman-Portuguese confrontations
Ottoman expedition to Aceh
Khilafat movement
Portuguese Armadas
Portuguese Discoveries
Portuguese discovery of the sea route to India
Discovery of the way to the Indies
Cape route

Communities and ethnicities
Bene-Israeli Jews
Paradesi Jews and Desi Jews
Luso-Indians, Portuguese Burghers& Kristang people
Luso-Asians and Eurasians
Bombayites and Basseinites
Goans and Damaonites
Mangaloreans and Karwaris
Kudalis (Maalvaanis)
Goan Moors, Sri Lanka Kaffir people, Indian Moors& Siddis
New Christians and Old Christians
Christian Brahmins and Christian Cxatrias
The Gauda and Kunbi and Koli Christians
Latin Catholics of Malabar and St Thomas Christians
History of Goan Catholics
Culture of Goan Catholics
History of Mangalorean Catholics
Culture of Mangalorean Catholics
History and Culture of Bombay East Indian Catholics
British Goans
Persecution of Mangalorean Christians at Seringapatam

Culture and Religion
Christianisation of Goa
Goan Catholic names and surnames
Mangalorean Catholic names
Vindaloo
Pastel de nata
Carnival in Goa
Primate of the East Indies
Krista Purana
Goan Catholic literature
Indo-Portuguese creole
Romi Konkani
Bombay East Indian dialect
Kristi language

Monuments and Artefacts (Architecture)
Seven Wonders of Portuguese Origin in the World

Churches and Convents
Catedral de Nossa Senhora dos Milagres
Igreja de Nossa Senhora dos Milagres (Mangalore)
Churches and convents of Goa
List of churches in Mumbai

Maritime forts and trading posts
Fort Manuel of Cochin
Fort Barcelor
Bahrain Fort
Fort Bassein
Colaba Fort
Chaul Fort
Bombay Castle
Bombay Fort
Bassein Fort
Asheri Fort
Arnala Fort
Diu Fort
Fort Naroa
Vypeen Fort
St Thomas Fort
Factories (trading posts)
List of tourist attractions in Mumbai

Aftermath, legacy& heritage 
Tourism in Goa
Tourism in Bombay
Goa and Damaon
Bombay state
Bombay presidency
United Goans Party
Portuguese Civil Code of Goa and Damaon
Goa Special Status

Possessions and Expeditions

Geography
St. Mary's Islands
Salsette Island
Ilhas de Goa or Tiswadi
Seven Islands of Bombay (South Bombay)
Diu Island
Vypeen Island
Ilha Formosa (Taiwan)
Anjediva Island
Ormus

Political
Portuguese Malacca
Portuguese Ceylon
Novas Conquistas
Portuguese Bombay and Bassein
Portuguese Chittagong
Portuguese Macao
Portuguese Malacca
Portuguese Timor
The Portuguese in Indonesia
Velhas Conquistas
Goa, Damaon& Diu
Silvassa

Notable persons

Indian and East Asian
Jose Gerson da Cunha
Joseph Vaz
Rodolf Dalgado
Walter de Sousa

European and Eurasian
António de Andrade
Francis Xavier
Gonsalo Garcia
Gaspar da Gama
Thomas Stephens (Jesuit)
Vasco da Gama
Alfonso de Albuquerque
Pedro Álvares Cabral
Miguel Caetano Dias
Tristao da Cunha
Diogo do Couto
Alessandro Valignano
Joao de Sa
Fernao Lopes (soldier)
Domingo Paes
Joao Caeiro

Post independence diaspora 
Ian D'Sa

Miscellaneous
Prester John

Lists of topics
History of Portugal
History of Europe
History of India
Portuguese India
Empires and kingdoms of India
India, Portuguese
States and territories established in 1505
India
States and territories disestablished in 1961
History of Kerala
Former countries in South Asia
History of Goa
Former colonies in Asia
1505 establishments in Portuguese India
Christian communities of India
Ethnic groups in India
Ethnic groups in Asia
Konkan
Regions of India
Landforms of Goa
Konkani
Ethnic groups in Mumbai
Indian Roman Catholics
Social groups of Maharashtra